Pulo di Molfetta is a doline located on the Murge plateau, in Apulia, southern Italy, around  south-west of the city of Molfetta. It originated due to the collapse of the ceiling of one or more caves. It shares the local toponym pulo with other large dolines of the region, i.e. Pulicchio di Gravina, Pulo di Molfetta and Pulicchio di Toritto.

See also 
 Pulo di Altamura
 Pulicchio di Gravina 
 Gurio Lamanna
 Molfetta

Sources

External links  
 http://luirig.altervista.org/cpm/albums/fenaroli1/001-micromeria-nervosa.jpg ;
 https://web.archive.org/web/20100416011809/http://luirig.altervista.org/flora/micromeria.htm

Karst
Landforms of Apulia
Sinkholes of Italy